The Singapore Civil Service are the set of civil servants working for the Government of Singapore. Together with the Singapore Armed Forces (SAF), statutory boards and other independent government bodies, the civil service makes up the overall public service of Singapore. As of 2022, the group employs about 87,000 officers.

Thomas Friedman of The New York Times considers the Singapore Civil Service to be one of the most efficient and uncorrupt bureaucracies in the world, with a high standard of discipline and accountability. It is also considered a key contributor to the success of Singapore since independence. Other commentators have argued that the persisting dominance of the People's Action Party (PAP) on civil office has led to complacency and groupthink, with the supporting ministries being resistant to alternative views and fundamentally unprepared for a change of government.

Overview
The Civil Service was inherited from the British system. Since Singapore's independence in 1965, the Civil Service has been closely tied with the governing People's Action Party (PAP). 

One of the ways by which the service recruits Singaporeans is through the competitive Public Service Commission (PSC) Scholarship. These full-ride scholarships are awarded to prospective undergraduate and post-graduate students based on their academic performance and extra-curricular activities; they are not need-based scholarships. Upon graduation, PSC Scholars are mandated to work in the Civil Service for a number of years on a bond, usually ranging from 4 to 6 years. Scholars must repay the bond if they choose to resign from the Civil Service before the completion of their mandated service. Many scholars who have remained in government have gone on to hold senior positions. Many Singaporean ministers are also drawn from the Civil Service, particularly from government scholars. 

The highest-ranking civil servant within a ministry is known as the permanent secretary. Permanent secretaries in each ministry used to be permanent in their postings. The current practice is to rotate them in various ministries every few years.

Head of the Civil Service
The highest-ranking civil servant is the head of Civil Service. The current head of Civil Service is Leo Yip, who took office in September 2017. He also holds the positions of Permanent Secretary at the Prime Minister's Office (Strategy Group) and National Security and Intelligence Coordination.

Salaries
The salaries of high-ranking civil servants in Singapore are some of the highest in the world, and are pegged to the salaries of the top-earning Singaporeans. This has led to some criticising the government for overpaying its employees. In response, the government has maintained that a high pay is necessary to prevent corruption, attrition, and the influence of outside money in the public service, as well as to attract talent from the private sector.

The salary of civil servants is organised into grades. The salary of Members of Parliament (MPs), Cabinet ministers, and judges are also based upon this scale. Salary grades generally begin with one or two letters, and end with a number that corresponds. The top civil service grades are grades 1 to 4, upon which ministerial salary is also pegged on.

The salaries of political appointments, such as the MPs and the speaker of Parliament, are ratios of the MR4 salary. While new ministers salaries start off at the MR4 grade, the prime minister may increase a minister's pay grade at his discretion. While the salaries of political leaders are generally fixed upon the pay grades, the salaries of civil servants may vary greatly. For example, the MR4 discount of being only 60% of the median top salary is done only for ministers, "to reflect the ethos of sacrifice that political service involves", and does not apply to civil servants.

For most civil servants, the pay scale consists of ranges rather than specific fixed salaries, and the actual salaries of civil servants can vary widely depending on performance and other factors. Most civil servants can be divided into three divisions, which each having its own pay grading system: Management Executives (MX); Operations Support (OSS); and Technical Support.

Senior civil servant pay grades are sometimes known as Staff Grade and Superscale (for senior management). MX9 superscale officers have an average annual salary range of about $200,000 to $260,000.

Code of conduct
Civil servants need to declare casino visitation within a week if they went to 2 local casinos more than four times a month, or if they have bought an annual entry pass.

See also
 Organisation of the Government of Singapore
 Statutory boards of the Government of Singapore
 Public Service Commission
 President's Scholar
 The SAF Scholarship

References

Civil service by country
 Singapore Civil Service